Monument Peak is a mountain peak located southeast of Fremont and northeast of Milpitas in the East Bay region of the San Francisco Bay Area in California.

Geography
The mountain is part of a ridge in the Diablo Range that includes Mount Allison and Mission Peak and forms part of the border between Alameda County and Santa Clara County.

The summit of Monument Peak lies just within the southern boundary of Mission Peak Regional Preserve in Alameda County and can be reached from the south via trails originating in Ed R. Levin County Park or from the north via the Bay Area Ridge Trail.

Antenna
Built on July 1, 1988, an antenna on Monument Peak broadcasts channels 36 (KICU) and 54 (PBS, KQEH) until January 17, 2018.
In the image above, the Monument Peak antenna is the tallest one seen (far right). The peak is the point directly right of the antenna. The antenna to the far left is on Mount Allison.

Other Monument Peaks
There are other Monument Peaks in California:
Monument Peak in El Dorado County, near the city of South Lake Tahoe. 10067 ft in elevation. Heavenly Mountain Resort operates on the slopes of this mountain.
Monument Peak in Riverside County, in the Temescal Mountains. 
Monument Peak in San Diego County, 6,200 ft. in elevation.  
Monument Peak in San Bernardino County, a distinctive spire 2379 ft. in elevation, the northernmost point on the Colorado River Indian Reservation.

References

External links 
 

Diablo Range
Mountains of Alameda County, California
Mountains of Santa Clara County, California
Milpitas, California
Mountains of the San Francisco Bay Area
Mountains of Northern California